Eupithecia citraria is a moth in the family Geometridae. It is found in south-western China (Yunnan).

The wingspan is about 21.5 mm. The forewings are reddish brown and the hindwings are brownish white.

References

Moths described in 2004
citraria
Moths of Asia